El Tigrillo Palma (born Efrén Aguilar Bernal) (El Varal , Guasave, Sinaloa) is a Regional Mexican singer. He is especially famous for his corridos.

See also
Music of Mexico

References

Mexican male singers
People from Guasave
Living people
Year of birth missing (living people)